Cwmbwrla is the name of an electoral ward in the City and County of Swansea, Wales, including the suburb of the same name.

The electoral ward consists of some or all of the following settlements: Brondeg, Brynhyfryd, Cwmbwrla, Cwmdu, Gendros and Manselton, in the parliamentary constituency of Swansea East.  The ward is bounded by the wards of Cockett to the west; Castle and Townhill to the south; Landore to the east; and Penderry and Mynydd-Bach to the north.

For the purposes of local elections, Cwmbwrla is broken down into the following polling districts: Manselton South, Cwmdu, Manselton North and Brynhyfryd.  The ward returns 3 councillors to the local council.  The ward is currently represented by: Peter Black (Lib Dems), Chris Holley (Lib Dems) and Graham Thomas (Lib Dems).

2012 local council elections
The results of the 2012 local council elections for Cwmbwrla were:

The electorate turnout was 35.21%

Swansea electoral wards